The United States Military Academy (USMA) is an undergraduate college in West Point, New York that educates and commissions officers for the United States Army. Twenty-one graduates of the Military Academy have been selected for astronaut training by the National Aeronautics and Space Administration (NASA), the third most out of any college in the United States. The first alumnus to graduate and go on to become an astronaut was Frank Borman, class of 1950. As of August 2022, the most recent alumnus to become an astronaut was Anne McClain, class of 2002. Five alumni were part of Project Gemini, six part of the Apollo program, two have walked on the Moon, and twelve were part of the Space Shuttle program.



Astronauts
Note: "Class year" refers to the alumni's class year, which usually is the same year they graduated. However, in times of war, classes often graduate early.

References
General

Inline citations

External links
NASA home page

American astronauts
West Point
Academy alumni, famous list
United States Army officers
As